Santo Domingo is a corregimiento in Bugaba District, Chiriquí Province, Panama. Its population as of 1990 was 1,988; its population as of 2000 was 2,276.

References

Corregimientos of Chiriquí Province